Fredrik Midtsjø (born 11 August 1993) is a Norwegian professional footballer who plays as a midfielder for Turkish Süper Lig club Galatasaray.

Midtsjø began his professional career at Norwegian club Rosenborg in 2010. After loan spells at Ranheim and Sandnes Ulf he became a regular in their team, making 96 league appearances and scoring 12 goals for Rosenborg. He signed for AZ in 2017.

Midtsjø made his full international debut in 2016.

Club career

Rosenborg
Midtsjø made his debut as a 16-year-old in the Norwegian Cup in May 2010 against his childhood team Stjørdals-Blink. Not long later he officially became a part of the Rosenborg squad. However, during the summer, Rosenborg brought in new players and decided to send him out on loan to local second tier team, Ranheim for the rest of the season.

Upon his return, he suffered a broken leg in a game for the second team, keeping him out for 7 months. After recovering from the injury, Rosenborg decided it was best to send him out on loan to another Tippeliga team, Sandnes Ulf for the 2014 season. He made his competitive debut for Sandnes Ulf on 30 March 2014, replacing Steven Lennon in a 1–1 draw against Odd. On 30 April, he scored his first competitive goal for the club, in a 2–1 home win over Stabæk. Midtsjø made a total of 28 appearances for Sandnes Ulf, in which he scored 5 goals as the club suffered relegation to the second division following the 2014 season.

Following the expiration of his loan, Midtsjø returned to Rosenborg and was part of the team for the 2015 season. He signed a new four-year contract with the club on 29 June 2016. On 24 October, he was nominated for the Kniksen Award as best midfielder of the 2016 Tippeligaen, eventually losing out to teammate Mike Jensen.

AZ
On 26 August 2017, Midtsjø joined Dutch Eredivisie club AZ for an undisclosed fee, signing a five-year contract. He was assigned shirt number 6 by the club.

Galatasaray
On 2 August 2022, Midtsjø joined Turkish club Galatasaray for a fee of €3.5 million, signing a three-year contract.

International career
He made his Norway national football team debut on 24 March 2016 in a friendly against Estonia. He continued to get called up occasionally through 2016 and 2017, and played his second game for his country, and his first as a starter, two years later on 23 March 2018 in a friendly against Australia.

Career statistics

Club

International

Honours
Rosenborg
 Norwegian League: 2015, 2016, 2017
 Norwegian Football Cup: 2015, 2016
 Mesterfinalen: 2017
 Norwegian U-19 Championship: 2009, 2011

References

External links
 
 

1993 births
Living people
Norwegian footballers
Norwegian expatriate footballers
Norway international footballers
Rosenborg BK players
Ranheim Fotball players
Sandnes Ulf players
AZ Alkmaar players
Galatasaray S.K. footballers
Eliteserien players
Norwegian First Division players
Eredivisie players
Association football midfielders
IL Stjørdals-Blink players
People from Stjørdal
Expatriate footballers in the Netherlands
Norwegian expatriate sportspeople in the Netherlands
Expatriate footballers in Turkey
Norwegian expatriate sportspeople in Turkey
Jong AZ players
Sportspeople from Trøndelag
Süper Lig players